Illimani is the highest mountain in the Cordillera Real (part of the Cordillera Oriental, a subrange of the Andes) of western Bolivia. It lies near the cities of El Alto and La Paz at the eastern edge of the Altiplano. It is the second highest peak in Bolivia, after Nevado Sajama, and the eighteenth highest peak in South America. The mountain has four main peaks; the highest is the south summit, Nevado Illimani, which is a popular ascent for mountain climbers.

Geologically, Illimani is composed primarily of granodiorite, intruded during the Cenozoic era into the sedimentary rock, which forms the bulk of the Cordillera Real.

Illimani is quite visible from the cities of El Alto and La Paz, and is their major landmark. The mountain has been the subject of many local songs, most importantly "Illimani", with the following refrain: "¡Illimani, Illimani, centinela tú eres de La Paz! ¡Illimani, Illimani, perla andina eres de Bolivia!" ("Illimani, Illimani, you are the sentinel of La Paz! Illimani, Illimani, you are Bolivia's andean pearl!")

Climbing

Illimani was first attempted in 1877 by the French explorator Charles Wiener, J. de Grumkow, and J. C. Ocampo. They failed to reach the main summit, but did reach a southeastern subsummit, on 19 May 1877, Wiener named it the "Pic de Paris", and left a French flag on top of it. 
In 1898, British climber William Martin Conway and two Italian guides, J.A. Maquignaz and L. Pellissier, made the first recorded ascent of the peak, again from the southeast.

The current standard route on the mountain climbs the west ridge of the main summit. It was first climbed in 1940, by the Germans R. Boetcher, F. Fritz, and W. Kühn, and is graded French PD+/AD-. This route usually requires four days, the summit being reached in the morning of the third day.

In July 2010 German climber Florian Hill and long-time Bolivian resident Robert Rauch climbed a new route on the 'South Face', completing most of the 1700m of ascent in 21 hours. Deliver Me (WI 6 and M6+) appears to climb the gable-end of the South West Ridge, a very steep wall threatened by large broken seracs.

Incidents
In 1973 Pierre Dedieu, French, and Ernesto Sánchez, Bolivia's best climber, perished climbing Illimani in August.
In November an Italian expedition after ascending Illimani undertook the search for their bodies, locating the body of Sánchez, but on the 23rd of that month, during extended search for Dedieu, the Italian leader Carlo Nembrini fell to his death.

Illimani was the site where Eastern Air Lines Flight 980 crashed on January 1, 1985.

US Major Kenneth R. Miller, US Colonel Paul Bruce Kappelman, and Bolivian guide Vincente Perez died in a climbing accident on June 7, 2003.

A German climber died on May 2, 2017 due to an avalanche occurring during the evening as he and his guide were climbing. The guide survived with minor injuries.

American climber Daniel Granberg died on the summit of Illimani in September 2021. His body was recovered after a two-day effort.

See also
 Cordillera Kimsa Cruz

Notes

External links

Mountains of La Paz Department (Bolivia)
Mountains of Bolivia
Glaciers of Bolivia
Six-thousanders of the Andes
Climbing areas of Bolivia